Na Hong-jin (born 1974) is a South Korean film director, producer and screenwriter. Na has won a multitude of awards with his films and most known for violent thriller and horror characteristics in his films.

Na first became recognised after releasing his first feature film debut titled The Chaser (2008) achieving both critical and commercial success, becoming the 3rd most selling film in Korea in 2008 and winning many awards such as Best film and director of the 45th Grand Bell Awards, Best film of the 7th Korean Film Awards as well as Best new director for many more. Na’s 2nd film The Yellow Sea (2010) was screened under the Un Certain Regard section at the 2011 Cannes Film Festival and received positive critical reviews on Metacritic. The Wailing (2016) is the next and most recent film that Na has directed which achieved both critical and commercial success, as well as accumulating a bounty of film awards such as the Best director of the 37th Blue Dragon Film Awards, the Bucheon International Film Festival award, and many more. Na worked on the Thai horror mockumentary The Medium (2021) as the writer and producer.

Early life 
Na Hong-jin graduated Hanyang University ERICA Campus Department of Crafts studying industrial arts and first entered started in the advertisement industry until he decided to pursue his dream as a film maker and then enrolled the Korea national University of Arts and Media.

Career 
Na Hong-jin has been active in the film industry since 2007.

Early directing work 
Na began in making short films before he would go on to make his large feature films. Na first debut short film was titled 5 Minutes (2003). It was only until his 2nd short film where Na started to gain some recognition; with the release of his short film A Perfect Red Snapper Dish (2005), Na managed to win best film in The Extreme Nightmare section at the Mise-en-scène Short Film Festival. He would then go on to make his third short film, Sweat (2007) that would win the best short film director prize at the Grand Bell Awards and jury prize from the Bucheon International Film Festival awards.

Feature films 
Na’s first feature and debut film was titled The Chaser (2008) that was met with critical acclaim as well as commercial success. The Chaser became one of the most watched films in Korea, peaking at third best selling films of 2008. The film was also screened at the Cannes Film Festival where reviewers hailed it as an “instant classic” in Korean thrillers and took home many awards such as the 16th Chunsa Film Art Awards for best director and screenplay. The Yellow Sea was released and entailed a more ambitious vision from Na. The Yellow Sea became the first Korean film to ever have a Hollywood studio collaboration, with the 20th Century Fox studio. Na’s second film achieved positive reviews but “lacking” compared to The Chaser. The film was invited to screen in the Un Certain Regard of the 2011 Cannes Film Festival. The follow up to The Yellow Sea was Na’s critically acclaimed third feature film, The Wailing. The film encompasses a deeper and weave of a combination of many themes such as religion, perception, comedy, and horror. The Wailing succeeded commercially and critically, again winning Na many film wards such as best director of the 37th Blue Dragon Film Awards, Best of Bucheon award at the Bucheon international fantastic film festival, the top film of the year of the 36th Korean Association of Film Critics Awards, and many more. The film premiered at the Cannes Film Festival and was shortly released onto streaming services.

Other Projects 
Na teamed up with Thai director Banjong Pisanthanakun, most known for the films Shutter (2004) and Alone (2007). Na acted as the producer and screenwriter for the Pisanthanakun's The Medium, a supernatural horror film mockumentary. The film premiered at the 25th Bucheon international fantastic film festival on 11 July 2021. When writing the story, Na explained in an interview that The Medium was initially a sequel to The Wailing with Hwang Jung-min’s shaman character. However this rendition did not come to light, as quoted by Na himself, “The Medium has no relation to The Wailing.”

Future Projects 
Na has claimed to have written many scripts during the time of the COVID-19 pandemic. In an interview, Na has described his working flow best summed in his own words, “Whenever I finish a film, I don’t want to go anywhere near another one.” Which words have echoed throughout his slow release of films despite being in the film industry for over 15 years and 3 films to his name.

Filmography

Awards 
2017 22nd Chunsa Film Art Awards: Best Director (The Wailing)
2016 16th Director's Cut Awards: Best Director (The Wailing)
 2016 37th Blue Dragon Film Awards: Best Director, Nomination – Best Screenplay (The Wailing)
 2016 Korea Film Actor's Association Top Star Awards: Best Director (The Wailing)
 2016 Korean Film Producers Association Awards: Best Director (The Wailing)
 2017 8th KOFRA Film Awards: Best Film, Best Director (The Wailing)
 2017 11th Asian Film Awards: Best Director (The Wailing)

References

External links 

1974 births
Living people
South Korean film directors
South Korean screenwriters
People from Seoul
Best Director Asian Film Award winners